Choke Canyon (titled On Dangerous Ground outside the United States) is a 1986 movie starring Stephen Collins as a "cowboy scientist" trying to develop an alternative energy source.  It was filmed mostly in the vicinity of Moab, Utah.

Plot
Harvard educated Dr. David Lowell's (Collins) research is carried out in the canyon country of southern Utah and must be conducted at the same time Halley's Comet is passing over the earth. Lowell is trying to find a safe, cheap energy source using the sound waves the comet generates.

Lowell leased the land from the Pilgrim Corporation. However, the Pilgrim Corporation decides the same canyon would be better used as a remote place to illegally dump nuclear waste. Pilgrim's CEO  (Nicholas Pryor) arranges for Lowell to be thrown off his land and destroys his laboratory.

Lowell spends the rest of the film committing sabotage against the company and trying to recover his land, assisted by the daughter of Pilgrim's CEO (Janet Julian) as well as unlikely help from a hit-man sympathetic to Lowell's cause (Bo Svenson). Brook Alistair (Lance Henriksen), hired by the Pilgrim Corporation, attempts to stop Lowell.

Production
Parts of the film were shot at Onion Creek, Professor Valley, the Moab Sand Flats, Dead Horse Point, Byrd's Ranch, Squaw Park, and Moab in Utah. Collins had to learn to ride a horse and get into great shape for the movie. He found it fun to play a "two fisted tough guy"

Release
Release of the film was delayed so it would coincide with the passing of Halley's Comet over the earth in 1986.

Soundtrack
The Mike + The Mechanics song "Silent Running" was chosen to appear in Choke Canyon because its atmosphere suited the film's tone. For promotional reasons, the song's title was extended to "Silent Running (On Dangerous Ground)" (the parenthetical title being the title of the film in the UK), even though the lyrics have no connection to the film. The promotional video for the song features a few clips from the film, but primarily follows the story of the lyrics, which are about an astronaut trying to send a message to the past in order to warn his family of an imminent societal breakdown.

Reception

The New York Times found the film to be "mildly enjoyable", but found the story slight. Reviewer D.J.R. Bruckner did praise the film's chase sequences.

TV Guide gave the movie two out of five stars, finding the film fun as it didn't take itself too seriously, but found the directing to be somewhat lacking. Creature Feature gave the movie 3 out of 5 stars, saying that it was a rousing adventure, although light on science fiction content. It also found the aerial scenes to be well done and liked the direction of the movie more than TV Guide did, but questioned the logic of the movie.

References

External links

1986 films
1980s science fiction action films
American science fiction action films
Films scored by Sylvester Levay
Films set in Utah
Films shot in Utah
Fiction about Halley's Comet
1980s English-language films
Films directed by Charles Bail
1980s American films